Herrera is a surname of Spanish origin, from the Latin word ferrāria, meaning "iron mine" or "iron works" and also the feminine of Latin ferrārius, "of or pertaining to iron"; or, alternatively, the feminine of Spanish herrero ("ironsmith", from ferrārius), which also gives the surname Herrero. Variants of the name include Errera, Ferrera and the less common Bherrera. Its equivalent in Portuguese and Galician is Ferreira. Also, because of Spanish naming customs, some people are listed here with their family name as their second-to-last name.

A

Aaron Herrera (born 1990), Mexican boxer
Abel Ernesto Herrera (born 1955), Argentine footballer
Abraham Cohen de Herrera or Alonso Nunez de Herrera (c. 1570–c. 1635), European religious philosopher and kabbalist
Adelardo López de Ayala y Herrera (1828–1879), Spanish writer and politician
Agustín Enrique Herrera (born 1985), Mexican football player
Alex Herrera (born 1976), Venezuelan baseball player
Alfonso Herrera (born 1983), Mexican actor 
Alfonso L. Herrera (1868–1942), Mexican biologist, author and educator 
Alicia Herrera Rivera (1928-2013), Chilean feminist lawyer
Ameurfina Melencio-Herrera (1922–2020), Filipino judge of the supreme court
Ander Herrera (born 1989), Spanish football player
Ángel Herrera Oria (1886–1968), Spanish cardinal
Ángel Herrera Vera (born 1957), Cuban boxer
Ángel Maria Herrera (1859–1948), Panamanian educator
Anthony Herrera (1944–2011), American actor
Anthony Herrera (American football) (born 1980), American football player
Antonio Ibáñez de la Riva Herrera (1633–1710), Spanish bishop
Armando Herrera (born 1955), Cuban triple jumper
Arquímedes Herrera (1935–2013), Venezuelan track and field athlete
Arsenio Cruz-Herrera (1863–1917), Filipino politician in Manila
Arturo Herrera (born 1959), Venezuelan visual artist
Astrid Carolina Herrera (born 1963), Venezuelan beauty pageant contestant and actress

B

Balbina Herrera (born c. 1955), Panamanian politician
Bernardino Herrera (born 1977), Spanish field hockey player
Bernardo Álvarez Herrera (1956–2016), Venezuelan politician and diplomat
Bobby Herrera (1926–2007), Mexican baseball player

C

Carl Herrera (born 1966), Venezuelan basketball player
Carlos Herrera (1856–1930), Guatemalan politician, president 1920 to 1921
Carlos Enrique Prado Herrera (born 1978), Cuban artist
Carlos Leonardo Herrera (born 1983), Argentine boxer
Carlos María Herrera (1875–1914), Uruguayan painter
Carlos Salazar Herrera (1906–1982), Costa Rican artist and writer
Carmen Herrera (1915–2022), Cuban painter
Carolina Herrera (born 1939), Venezuelan-born American fashion designer
Chalía Herrera (1864–1948), Cuban opera singer
Cristóbal Martín de Herrera (1831–1878), Spanish politician

D

Daniel Herrera (baseball) (born 1984), baseball player
Daniel Herrera (rugby union) (born 1963), Uruguayan rugby union coach
Daniel Rendón Herrera (born 1966), Colombian drug lord
Danny Herrera (musician) (born 1969), American drummer for Napalm Death
Danny Herrera (strongman) (1937–2008), American powerlifter
Dario Herrera (born 1973), American politician from Nevada
Dennis Herrera (born 1962), American politician in San Francisco
Diego Herrera (born 1969), Ecuadorian footballer
Dionisio de Herrera (1781—1850), Honduran politician, head of Honduras and of Nicaragua

E

Eddy Herrera (born 1964), Dominican merengue singer
Eduardo Herrera (golfer) (born 1965), Colombian golfer
Eduardo Herrera (footballer, born 1988), Mexican footballer
Edward Herrera (born 1986), Maltese footballer
Efraín Herrera (born 1959), Mexican footballer
Efren Herrera (born 1951), Mexican-born American football kicker
Eladio Herrera (boxer) (1930–2014), Argentine boxer
Eladio Herrera (Chilean footballer) (born 1984), Chilean footballer
Elder Herrera (born 1968), Colombian road cyclist
Elián Herrera (baseball) (born 1985), Dominican baseball player
Elián Herrera (model) (born 1991), Venezuelan model and beauty pageant contestant
Emanuel Herrera (born 1987), Argentine footballer 
Engelver Herrera (born 1973), Guatemalan footballer
Enrique Olaya Herrera (1880–1937), Colombian politician, president 1930 to 1934 
Eric Herrera (born 1992), Panamanian footballer
Ernesto Herrera (1889–1917), Uruguayan playwright, short story writer and journalist
Esteban Eduardo González Herrera (born 1982), Chilean footballer
Esteban José Herrera (born 1981), Argentine footballer

F

Fernando Herrera (bishop) (died 1518), Italian Roman Catholic bishop
Fernando Herrera (footballer) (born 1985), Mexican footballer
Fernando de Acuña y de Herrera (died 1495), Sicilian politician, Viceroy 
Felipe Herrera (1922–1996), Chilean economist, lawyer and academic
Fernando de Herrera or El Divino (c. 1534–1597), Spanish poet and man of letters
Flavio Herrera (1895–1968), Guatemalan writer and diplomat
Francisco Herrera the Elder (1576–1656), Spanish painter
Francisco Herrera the Younger (1622–1685), Spanish painter and architect
Franklin Herrera (born 1988), Bolivian footballer
Freddy Herrera (born 1973), Panamanian baseball player

G

Gabriel Alonso de Herrera (1470–1539), Spanish author on agriculture
Georgina Herrera (1936–2021), Cuban writer and poet
Germán Herrera (born 1983), Argentine footballer
Gloria de Herrera (1929–1985), American art restorer and collector
Gonzalo O'Farrill y Herrera (1754–1831), Spanish military and political figure
Grisel Herrera (born 1971), Cuban basketball player
Gustavo Herrera (1890–1953), Venezuelan politician

H

Héctor Herrera (runner) (born 1959), Cuban runner
Héctor Belo Herrera (1905–after 1924), Uruguayan fencer
Héctor Herrera (born 1990), Mexican footballer
Helenio Herrera (1910–1997), Franco-Argentine football player and manager
Hélmer Herrera (1951–1998), Colombian drug trafficker
Heriberto Herrera (1926–1996), Paraguayan football player and coach
Hugo Herrera (born 1979), Argentine footballer

I
Ignacio Herrera (born 1987), Chilean footballer 
Inés Herrera (born 1978), Spanish footballer
Irisberto Herrera (born 1968), Spanish-Cuban chess player
Iván Herrera (born 2000), Panamanian baseball player
Iván Herrera (footballer) (born 1985), Chilean footballer

J
Jaime Lynn Herrera (born 1978), American politician in the state of Washington
Jarol Herrera (born 1984), Colombian footballer
Jerónimo Tomás Abreu Herrera (1930–2012), bishop of Mao-Monte-Cristi, Dominican Republic
Jesús Herrera (born 1962), Mexican long-distance runner
Jesús Herrera Alonso (1938–1962), Spanish footballer
Jesús Héctor Gallego Herrera (died 1971), Colombian priest who was kidnapped and killed
Jhoel Herrera (born 1980), Peruvian footballer
Joaquín Ramón Herrera (born 1969), American writer, illustrator, photographer and musician
John Herrera (gridiron football), American football executive
John J. Herrera (1910–1986), American attorney and civil-rights activist
Johnny Herrera (born 1966), American racing driver
Johnny Herrera (goalkeeper) (born 1981), Chilean footballer 
Jonathan Herrera (baseball) (born 1984), Venezuelan baseball player
Jorge Herrera (swimmer) (born 1972), Puerto Rican freestyle swimmer
Jorge Herrera (footballer) (born 1980), Colombian footballer
José Herrera (1960s outfielder) (1942–2009), Venezuelan baseball player
José Herrera (1990s outfielder) (born 1972), Dominican baseball player
José Antonio Collado Herrera (born 1990), Spanish footballer
José Cañas Ruiz-Herrera (born 1987), Spanish footballer
José Carlos Herrera (born 1986), Mexican sprinter
José Cruz Herrera (1890–1972), Spanish painter
José Joaquín de Herrera (1792–1854), Mexican politician, president nonconsecutively 1844 to 1851 
José Oscar Herrera (born 1965), Uruguayan footballer
José de la Paz Herrera (1940–2021), Honduran footballer and coach
Juan Herrera (born 1958), Mexican boxer
Juan de Herrera (1530–1597), Spanish architect, mathematician and geometrician
Juan Felipe Herrera (born 1948), American writer, cartoonist, teacher, and activist
Juan Francisco Rodríguez Herrera or Juanito (born 1965), Spanish footballer
Juan Moreno y Herrera-Jiménez or Jean Reno (born 1948), French actor of Spanish origin
Juan Vicente Herrera Campo (born 1956), Spanish politician, president of the community of Castile and León
Judith C. Herrera (born 1954), American judge
Judy Herrera American actress
Julio Herrera (cyclist) (born 1980), Venezuelan track and road cyclist
Julio Herrera (politician) (born 1956), Peruvian politician from Lima
Julio César Herrera (born 1977), Cuban track cyclist
Julius Caesar Herrera (born 1953), Filipino lawyer and politician

K

Kelvin Herrera (born 1989), Dominican baseball player
Kristin Herrera (born 1989), American actress

L
 León Herrera Esteban (1922–2003), Spanish military officer and politician
Leticia Herrera Sánchez (born 1949), Nicaraguan lawyer, guerrilla leader, and politician
Lola Herrera (born 1935), Spanish actress
Lorena Herrera (born 1967), Mexican actress
Lorenzo Herrera (1896–1960), Venezuelan singer and composer 
Luis Herrera (cyclist) (born 1961), Colombian road cyclist
Luis Herrera (tennis) (born 1971), Mexican tennis player
Luis Herrera Campins (1925–2007), president of Venezuela 
Luis Alberto de Herrera (1873–1959), Uruguayan lawyer, diplomat, journalist and politician
Luis Beder Herrera (born 1951), Argentine politician, governor of La Rioja Province
Luis Bayón Herrera (1889–1956), Spanish film director and screenwriter
Luis Fernando Herrera (born 1962), Colombian footballer
Luz María Umpierre-Herrera (born 1947), Puerto Rican poet, scholar, educator and advocate

M

M. Miriam Herrera *born 1963), American author and poet
Magos Herrera (born 1970), Mexican jazz singer
Manuel C. Herrera (c. 1924–1998), Filipino politician
Marcelo Herrera (footballer, born 1966) (born 1966), Argentine football player 
Marcelo Herrera (footballer, born 1992) (born 1992), Argentine football player 
María Teresa Herrera (born 1956), Mexican politician and judge
Martín Herrera (born 1970), Argentine footballer
Mary Herrera (born 1959), American politician in New Mexico 
Matti Herrera Bower, Cuban-born American politician in Florida
Mauricio Herrera (born 1980), Mexican-American boxer
Maya Herrera fictional character in the TV drama Heroes
Mayra Herrera (born 1988), Guatemalan race walker
Michael Herrera (born 1985), Cuban track and field athlete
Miguel Herrera (born 1968), Mexican football coach 
Miguel Ángel Chico Herrera (born 1961), Mexican politician
Mike Herrera (baseball) (1897–1978), Cuban baseball player
Mike Herrera (musician) (born 1976), American vocalist and bass guitarist for MxPx and Tumbledown
Mirta Cerra Herrera (1904–1986), Cuban painter

N

Nadege Herrera (born 1986), Panamanian model and beauty pageant contestant
Nancy Cooke de Herrera (1922–2013), American socialite, fashion expert and author
Nancy Fabiola Herrera, Venezuelan opera singer 
Napoleón Nassar Herrera, Honduran politician and military officer 
Nicolás Herrera (born 1983), Argentine footballer

O
Odúbel Herrera (born 1991), Venezuelan baseball player
Omar Torrijos Herrera (1929–1981), Panamanian de facto leader 1968 to 1981

P

Pablo Herrera (beach volleyball) (born 1982), Spanish beach volleyball player
Pablo Herrera (musician), Cuban hip hop music producer
Paco Herrera (born 1953), Spanish footballer and manager
Paloma Herrera (born 1975), Argentine ballet dancer
Pancho Herrera (1934–2005), Cuban baseball player
Pedro de Herrera (15th century), Spanish Jewish leader

R

Rafael Herrera (born 1945), Mexican boxer
Rafaela Herrera (1742–1805), a national heroine of Nicaragua
Ram Herrera, Tejano musician
Raymond Herrera (born 1972), American drummer for Arkaea, Fear Factory and Brujeria
René Herrera, Texan singer, half of René y René
Rene Herrera (athlete) (born 1979), Filipino track and field athlete
Rich Herrera, American sports radio personality
Robbie Herrera (born 1970), English footballer
Robert Herrera (born 1989), Uruguayan footballer
Roberto Herrera, Argentine choreographer and dancer
Roberto Díaz Herrera (born 1937), Panamanian military officer and exile
Ronald Gamarra Herrera, Peruvian politician
Ronald Herrera (born 1995), Venezuelan baseball player

S

Santos León Herrera (1874–1950), Costa Rican politician, president 1948
Saúl González Herrera (1915–2006), Mexican politician
Sergio Herrera (born 1981), Colombian footballer
Silvestre S. Herrera (1917–2007), Mexican-American recipient of the Medal of Honor
Simón de Herrera (1754-1813), governor of Nuevo León, New Spain, & interim governor of Spanish Texas

T

Teresa Tanco Cordovez de Herrera (1859–1946), Colombian pianist and composer
Tomás de Herrera (1804–1854), president of the Republic of the New Granada
Tommy Herrera (1933–1997), American baseball player and manager

V

Velino Herrera or Ma Pe Wi (1902–1973), Pueblo Indian painter
Vicente Herrera Zeledón (1821–1888), Costa Rican politician, president 1876 to 1877
Víctor Herrera (born 1970), Colombian track and road cyclist
Victor Larco Herrera (1870–1939), Peruvian politician
Victor Manuel Velasco Herrera, Mexican physicist

W

Wladimir Herrera (born 1981), Chilean footballer

X

Ximena Herrera (born 1979), Bolivian-born Mexican actress

Y
Yangel Herrera (born 1998), Venezuelan football player
Yoslan Herrera (born 1981), Cuban baseball player
Yusleinis Herrera (born 1984), Cuban volleyball player

See also
Herrera (disambiguation)
Herrero (surname), the masculine form of Herrera
Ferreira (surname), a related Portuguese surname
Laferrière (surname), a related French surname

Spanish-language surnames
Surnames of Spanish origin